The  WA Sporting Car Club is a motorsport organisation that has operated for over 80 years in the state of Western Australia.

Early years 
The club was involved in the development of flying mile speed contests in 1932, as well as the Albany Speed Classic in 1936.

In the 1930s, activities included hill climbs, open events, organisation of country events, speed tests, and trials, including events previously run by the Royal Automobile Club of Western Australia.
 
It had also operated from other raceways, including the Caversham Raceway, the Brooklands Track (1930s West Subiaco), Nicholson Road, Cannington track, as well as country locations.

1970s 
The club was the builder of, and has been the operator of Wanneroo Raceway since the 1970s.

Publications 
The Club has had a range of periodicals that have included other clubs and related sports based in Western Australia over the years.
 Monthly news (1950-1951)
 The visor (1951-1971)
 Newsletter - later called 20/20 looking to the future of motorsport in WA
 The racing line

External links

Notes

1929 establishments in Australia
Motorsport in Western Australia
Sports organizations established in 1929
Clubs and societies in Western Australia
Auto racing organizations
Wanneroo Raceway